Tapa (Abdul Medjid) Bey Ortsu Tchermoev (1882 – August 28, 1937) ( or Тапа Абдул Миджит Бей Орцу Чермо́ев) was a North Caucasian statesman of Chechen origin, general, oil magnate and the first prime minister of the Mountainous Republic of the Northern Caucasus. He was in office from 11 May 1918 until December 1918. His official title was General Tchermoeff, Prime Minister of the Mountainous Republic of the Northern Caucasus.

Early life

Born in Grozny, Chechnya, in 1882, Tapa was the eldest son of General Ortsu Tchermoev and belonged to the Biltoy teip. He graduated in 1901 and joined an elite military unit, His Majesty's Own Cossack Escort of Tsar Nicholas II.

Tapa Tchermoev married Princess Khavarsultan Khanim Ibrahimbeyova of Persia in 1906. Although still a young man, he was obliged to leave the army in 1908 when his father died. During this time, he threw himself into economic and industrial activities. His family owned important parcels of oil-bearing land in the Grozny area. Tapa automatically became one of the most active and energetic pioneers of the Grozny oil industry.

World War I interrupted Tapa's economic activity. He joined the famous native Savage Division of the Imperial Russian Army with the rank of captain. In the war he proved himself a brilliant military leader and a fearless soldier. After the October Revolution, Tapa returned to his native land with an intention to stem the rise of Bolshevism in Chechnya.

The Mountainous Republic of the Northern Caucasus

Tapa believed the unifying of all Caucasian highlanders to be the only way of saving the Northern Caucasus from the Bolsheviks. On his initiative and thanks to his unrelenting energy, a convention of Caucasian highlanders took place in March 1917. This meeting resolved to form an independent highland state. On 11 May 1918 the Mountainous Republic of the Northern Caucasus was officially established. Tapa was first the prime minister and then the minister for foreign affairs.

Early in March 1919, Tapa headed a delegation to Paris in an attempt to take part in the Treaty of Versailles. The object of the delegation was to secure the recognition of the independence of the Mountainous Republic of the Northern Caucasus. A year later, the North Caucasus was in the hands of the Bolsheviks and in January 1921 the Soviet Mountain Republic of the Russian SFSR was established.

From his second marriage he had a daughter,  Marianne Bicat (March 27, 1921 - 1985).

References

 Baddeley, J. F., 1908, The Russian Conquest of the Caucasus, Longmans, Green, and Co., London
 Henrey, Mrs Robert, 1954, Madeleine Grown Up, J. M. Dent & Sons, London
 Caucasian Republic Mission to the Peace Conference Appeal for Help, Friday 4 April 1919, The Morning Post, London.
 Tapa Charmoyev's Obituary The Times written by Elti Temihan
 Storozhenko (Ed.), 1995, Ingushetia and Chechen Republic Map, Northern Caucasian Aerogeodesic Company of Roskartografia, Russia.

External links
Conflict in Chechnya: A Background Perspective
Charlotte Aliston. The Suggested Basis for a Russian Federal Republic': Britain, Anti-Bolshevik Russia and the Border States at the Paris Peace Conference, 1919
Madeline Grown Up by Mrs Robert Henrey, 1952

1882 births
1937 deaths
Chechen politicians
Russian military personnel of World War I
People of the Russian Revolution
Generals of the Russian Empire
Chechen anti-communists
People from Grozny
North Caucasian independence activists